Kendriya Vidyalaya, Sivaganga, (Hindi: केन्द्रीय विद्यालय, शिवगंगा) (Hindi for Central School, Sivaganga) is a system of central government schools under the Ministry of Human Resource Development (India). It's located in Sivaganga. The system came into being in 2009 under the name "Central Schools", and has been affiliated with CBSE.

History 
Kendriya Vidyala, Sivaganga was founded on 12 December 2009.

See also 
 List of Kendriya Vidyalayas

References

Central Board of Secondary Education
 
Education in Sivaganga district
Educational institutions established in 2009
2009 establishments in Tamil Nadu